The Review and Herald Publishing Association was the oldest of two Seventh-day Adventist publishing houses in North America.  The organization published books, magazines, study guides, CDs, videos and games for Adventist churches, schools and individual subscribers.  It also printed and distributed the Adventist Review magazine. In 2014 the Review and Herald Publishing Association was absorbed by its sister publisher, Pacific Press Publishing Association but maintains its board and administrators. The Maryland publishing house closed and some of its personnel and assets relocated to PPPA, in Nampa, Idaho.

History

The roots of the Review and Herald Publishing   Association go back to 1849 when James White produced The Present Truth and, in 1850, The Advent Review.  From there the publication house grew and moved to Battle Creek, Michigan.

A major fire on December 30, 1902, destroyed the offices.  The headquarters was then moved to Takoma Park, Maryland.  In the 1950s, the association developed The Bible Story by Arthur S. Maxwell. The set was notable for its size—including 411 stories from the Bible—and for having color illustrations on each page opening—an extravagant expense for a book publisher at that time.

In 1983, under the leadership of Elder Bud Otis, the organization moved to a new,  $14 million facility in Hagerstown, Maryland on a  campus; at that time  the publishing house had 350 employees and an annual payroll of $6.7 million.

Edson White established the Gospel Herald Publishing Company in Nashville, Tennessee, which was renamed to Southern Publishing Association in 1901. It merged with the Review and Herald in 1980.

In creative works
The 2014 documentary film War in Heaven, War on Earth: The Birth of the Seventh-day Adventist Church During the American Civil War by Chris Small and Loren Small discusses the formation of the Review and Herald Publishing Association.

See also
List of Seventh-day Adventist periodicals
Pacific Press Publishing Association
The Clear Word

References

External links
 Review and Herald Publishing Association Official website

Christian publishing companies
Card game publishing companies
Religious tract publishing companies
Seventh-day Adventist media
Book publishing companies based in Maryland
Magazine publishing companies of the United States
Hagerstown, Maryland
Washington County, Maryland
Mass media in Hagerstown metropolitan area
Privately held companies based in Connecticut
Rocky Hill, Connecticut
1849 establishments in Connecticut
Former Seventh-day Adventist institutions
Seventh-day Adventist organizations